Deryck Cyril Levick (27 May 1929 – July 2004) was an English cricketer. Levick was a right-handed batsman. He was born at Ealing, Middlesex, son of Robert and Emily Barratt.

Levick made his first-class debut for Essex against Leicestershire in the 1950 County Championship. He played 2 further first-class fixtures the following season against Warwickshire and Yorkshire, marking his final first-class representation for the county. Levick failed to capitalise on 3 opportunities at first-class level, scoring just 14 runs in his 3 matches at a batting average of 2.33 and a high score of 6.

He died in Barking, London in July 2004.

References

External links
Deryck Levick at Cricinfo
Deryck Levick at CricketArchive

1929 births
2004 deaths
People from Ealing
People from Barking, London
English cricketers
Essex cricketers